Afonyevka is a rural locality (a selo) in Volokonovsky District, Belgorod Oblast, Russia. The population was 481 as of 2010. There are 5 streets.

Geography 
Afonyevka is located 14 km north of Volokonovka (the district's administrative centre) by road. Korovino is the nearest rural locality.

References 

Rural localities in Volokonovsky District